This list includes properties and districts listed on the California Historical Landmark listing in Tulare County, California. Click the "Map of all coordinates" link to the right to view a Google map of all properties and districts with latitude and longitude coordinates in the table below.

|}

References

See also

List of California Historical Landmarks
National Register of Historic Places listings in Tulare County, California

  

.
List of California Historical Landmarks
Protected areas of Tulare County, California
Tulare County, California
History of the San Joaquin Valley
History of the Sierra Nevada (United States)